

Events
 1545 – Part of the Biblioteca Marciana in Venice collapses, causing the architect, Jacopo Sansovino, to be imprisoned briefly.
 1546 – Michelangelo Buonarroti is made chief architect of St. Peter's Basilica in Rome.
 1549 – The spire of Lincoln Cathedral in England is blown down.

Buildings and structures

Buildings

 1540
 Kamran's Baradari in Lahore completed
 Approximate date of completion of some of the Device Forts on the coast of England: Calshot, Sandgate, Sandown and Walmer Castles
 Approximate date of the construction of Santa Cecilia Chapel in Għajnsielem, Gozo, Malta
 c. 1541
 Portland Castle on the Isle of Portland, England, completed
 Qila-i-Kuhna Mosque in the Purana Qila in Delhi completed
 1541–1544 – Old Hall of Berkhamsted School in England built
 1542
 Andrea Palladio completes his first commission at Villa Godi, first of his Palladian villas of Veneto; the neighbouring Villa Piovene is completed at about the same time
 Church of Saint Lucius, designed by Tommaso Rodari in the style of Bramante, is completed at its original location in Lugano, Switzerland
 Approximate date of completion of more of the Device Forts on the coast of England: Pendennis and St Mawes Castles in Cornwall, East Cowes Castle on the Isle of Wight and Sandsfoot Castle at Weymouth, Dorset

 1543 – Lighthouse of Genoa completed in surviving form
 1543–1548 – Mimar Sinan builds his first significant architectural commission, Şehzade Mosque in Istanbul.
 1544 – King's College Chapel, Cambridge completed
 1544–1549 – Xuanfu–Datong section of Ming Great Wall of China constructed
 c. 1546 – Loggetta del Sansovino of St Mark's Campanile in Piazza San Marco, Venice, designed by Jacopo Sansovino, is completed
 1547
 Construction of the Château de Chambord ceases on the death of Francis I of France
 Yarmouth Castle on the Isle of Wight is completed
 1548–1549 – Villa Pojana, one of the Palladian villas of Veneto, is built.

Births
 c.1540 – Sedefkar Mehmed Agha, Ottoman architect (died 1617)
 1548: September 2 – Vincenzo Scamozzi, Italian architect (died 1616)

Deaths
 1543: June 25 – Giovanni Mangone, Italian sculptor, architect, military engineer and antiquarian
 1546
 August 3 – Antonio da Sangallo the Younger, Italian architect (born 1484)
 November 1 – Giulio Romano, Italian painter and architect (born c. 1449)

References

Architecture